The City of Bayswater is a local government area in Perth, Western Australia. It was established in 1897 as the Bayswater Road Board, with a chairman elected by the board members as its leader. In 1961, it became the Shire of Bayswater following the passage of the Local Government Act 1960, with a president elected by the councillors as its leader. In 1983, it achieved city status, becoming the City of Bayswater, with a mayor elected by the councillors as its leader.

The first chairman of Bayswater was Henry Thomas Halliday, who was elected to the position at the board's inaugural meeting on 7 June 1897. He resigned on 20 December 1899. The current mayor of the City of Bayswater is Filomena Piffaretti, who was elected as the city's first female mayor on 18 October 2021. The mayor is elected by councillors after each election. Bayswater is one of the few remaining councils to do so.

Political parties do not typically endorse candidates in local government in Western Australia. However, councillors are often members of political parties. Dick Ardagh was a member of the Western Australian Legislative Council for the North East Province from 1912 to 1924, serving concurrently as chairman of the Bayswater Road Board from 1920 to 1923, and in 1924. He was a member of the Australian Labor Party until 1917, and a member of the National Labor Party following 1917.

Two mayors/presidents/chairmen have continued on to become members of the Western Australian Legislative Assembly for the Australian Labor Party. Merv Toms was the member for Maylands from 1956 to 1962, member for Bayswater from 1962 to 1968, and member for Ascot from 1968 until his death in 1971. He served on the council during this time as well, albeit not as chairman. John D'Orazio was the member for Ballajura from 2001 to 2008. He left the Labor party in 2006, sitting as an independent politician, before joining again in 2008. He lost preselection for the seat for the 2008 state election, so he contested it as an independent.

Other Bayswater mayors known to have been part of the Labor party include Lou Magro, Terry Kenyon, Barry McKenna, Dan Bull and Filomena Piffaretti. Lou Magro quit the Labor party in May 2008 after failing to be preselected for the electoral district of Morley. Sylvan Albert is known to have been a member of the Liberal Party of Australia, having been their candidate for the electoral district of Maylands at the 2013 Western Australian state election.

Between October 1978 and February 1979, the Shire of Bayswater was run by a state government appointed commissioner, after the council was sacked for mismanagement, corruption and various actions breaking the Local Government Act. As such, the council did not have a mayor during that time.

Bayswater Road Board

Shire of Bayswater

City of Bayswater

References

Bibliography
 
 

Lists of local government leaders in Western Australia
City of Bayswater